Gábor Gyömbér (born 27 February 1988 in Makó) is a Hungarian footballer who currently plays for Soroksár SC.

Club statistics

Updated to games played as of 2 December 2014.

Honours
Ferencváros
Hungarian League Cup: 2012–13

External links
Gábor Gyömbér profile at magyarfutball.hu
HLSZ

UEFA Official Website

1988 births
Living people
People from Makó
Hungarian footballers
Hungary international footballers
Association football midfielders
Clube Náutico Capibaribe players
FC Sopron players
Lombard-Pápa TFC footballers
Ferencvárosi TC footballers
Nemzeti Bajnokság I players
Hungarian expatriate footballers
Expatriate footballers in Brazil
Hungarian expatriate sportspeople in Brazil
Sportspeople from Csongrád-Csanád County